Marek Pinc (born March 20, 1979 in Most, Czechoslovakia) is a Czech ice hockey player, playing currently for Dundee Stars of the EIHL. He is one of the best goaltenders in the country and has played several seasons for the national team.

International play
Pinc made his full international debut in 2007, playing in the 2007 World Championship as replacement for Roman Čechmánek, and 2008 World Championship. He previously had played for the Czech Republic men's national junior ice hockey team.

References

External links

 Marek Pinc at the official page of HC Liberec
 Marek Pinc at the official page of HC Vítkovice

1979 births
Czech ice hockey goaltenders
HC Bílí Tygři Liberec players
Rytíři Kladno players
HC Litvínov players
HC Vítkovice players
Sheffield Steelers players
Living people
Sportspeople from Most (city)
Yertis Pavlodar players
Beibarys Atyrau players
EHC Biel players
Czech expatriate ice hockey players in Russia
Czech expatriate ice hockey players in Switzerland
Czech expatriate sportspeople in Kazakhstan
Czech expatriate sportspeople in England
Expatriate ice hockey players in Kazakhstan
Expatriate ice hockey players in England